Schiefer is a German-language surname and a metonymic oiccupational name for a roofer. It may refer to:

Gernot Schiefer
Ulrich Schiefer (1952), German rural and development sociologist and anthropologist
Ulrich W. Schiefer (1958), German graduated engineer
Waltraud Schiefer (1979), Italian luger

References 

Occupational surnames
German-language surnames